This article lists the squads for the 2018 SheBelieves Cup, the 3rd edition of the SheBelieves Cup. The cup consisted of a series of friendly games, and was held in the United States from 1 to 7 March 2018. The four national teams involved in the tournament registered a squad of 23 players.

The age listed for each player is on 1 March 2018, the first day of the tournament. The club listed is the club for which the player last played a competitive match prior to the tournament. The nationality for each club reflects the national association (not the league) to which the club is affiliated. A flag is included for coaches that are of a different nationality than their own national team.

Squads

England
Coach: Phil Neville

The final squad was announced on 20 February 2018. On 24 February 2018, Steph Houghton, Karen Carney, and Jordan Nobbs withdrew due to injuries and were replaced by Rachel Daly, Abbie McManus, and Georgia Stanway.

France
Coach: Corinne Diacre

The final squad was announced on 20 February 2018.

Germany
Coach: Steffi Jones

The final squad was announced on 12 February 2018.

United States
Coach: Jill Ellis

The final squad was announced on 23 February 2018.

Player representation

By club
Clubs with 3 or more players represented are listed.

By club nationality

By club federation

By representatives of domestic league

References

2018
2018 in American women's soccer
2018 in women's association football
2017–18 in English women's football
March 2018 sports events in the United States